Noor Khan may refer to:

Malik Nur Khan (1923–2011), Commander-in-Chief of the Pakistan Air Force 
Noor Alam Khan (born 1972), Pakistani politician
Noor Inayat Khan (1914–1944), Allied special agent in the second world war
Noor Khan (actress) (born 1994), Pakistani television actress